Jiang Futang (born October 1941) is a general (shangjiang) of the People's Liberation Army (PLA). He was a representative of the 13th and 14th National Congress of the Chinese Communist Party. He was a member of the 15th and 16th Central Committee of the Chinese Communist Party. He was a member of the Standing Committee of the 11th National People's Congress.

Biography
Jiang was born in the town of Tengjia, in Rongcheng County (now Rongcheng), Shandong, in October 1941. 

He enlisted in the People's Liberation Army (PLA) in January 1959, and joined the Chinese Communist Party (CCP) in May 1960. In August 1976, he rose to become director of Political Department of the 26th Group Army, and then political commissar in May 1983. In January 1985, he was appointed political commissar of the 67th Group Army. During his tenure, he participated in the Sino-Vietnamese War. In June 1985, he was appointed director of Political Department of the Jinan Military Region, he remained in that position until December 1993, when he was transferred to the Chengdu Military Region and appointed deputy political commissar and director of Political Department. He became political commissar of the Shenyang Military Region in September 1995, and served until December 2005. In March 2008, he was made vice chairperson of the National People's Congress Foreign Affairs Committee.

He was promoted to the rank of major general (shaojiang) in September 1988, lieutenant general (zhongjiang) in July 1993 and general (shangjiang) in June 2002.

References

1941 births
Living people
People from Rongcheng, Shandong
Shandong University alumni
PLA National Defence University alumni
People's Liberation Army generals from Shandong
People's Republic of China politicians from Shandong
Chinese Communist Party politicians from Shandong
Members of the 15th Central Committee of the Chinese Communist Party
Members of the 16th Central Committee of the Chinese Communist Party
Members of the Standing Committee of the 11th National People's Congress